Spectracanthicus murinus is a species of suckermouth armored catfish endemic to Brazil where it is found in the Tapajós River basin.  This species grows to a length of  SL.

S. murinus appears to be unique in the sub-family Ancistrinae in that it has lost many of the traits that describe this group, such as evertible cheek plates and modified opercle.

References

Ancistrini
Fish of South America
Fish of Brazil
Endemic fauna of Brazil
Fish described in 1987